Santa Olalla is a village in the province of Toledo and autonomous community of Castile-La Mancha, Spain. 
According to the 2014 census, the municipality has a population of 3,326 inhabitants.

It is named for Saint Eulalia of Mérida.

References

External links

Municipalities in the Province of Toledo